Oleshenka is a rural locality (a khutor) in Starobelitsky Selsoviet Rural Settlement, Konyshyovsky District, Kursk Oblast, Russia. Population:

Geography 
The khutor is located in the Belichka River basin (a left tributary of the Svapa River), 56 km from the Russia–Ukraine border, 75 km north-west of Kursk, 20 km north-west of the district center – the urban-type settlement Konyshyovka, 1.5 km from the selsoviet center – Staraya Belitsa.

 Climate
Oleshenka has a warm-summer humid continental climate (Dfb in the Köppen climate classification).

Transport 
Oleshenka is located 48 km from the federal route  Ukraine Highway, 44 km from the route  Crimea Highway, 20 km from the route  (Trosna – M3 highway), 5.5 km from the road of regional importance  (Fatezh – Dmitriyev), 15 km from the road  (Konyshyovka – Zhigayevo – 38K-038), 10 km from the road  (Dmitriyev – Beryoza – Menshikovo – Khomutovka), on the road of intermunicipal significance  (38N-144 – Oleshenka, with the access road to Naumovka), 2.5 km from the nearest railway halt 536 km (railway line Navlya – Lgov-Kiyevsky).

The rural locality is situated 81 km from Kursk Vostochny Airport, 179 km from Belgorod International Airport and 280 km from Voronezh Peter the Great Airport.

References

Notes

Sources

Rural localities in Konyshyovsky District